Brett Icahn (born August 19, 1979) is an American businessman, investor, and philanthropist.

Early life
His father is billionaire investor Carl Icahn (born 1936), majority shareholder of Icahn Enterprises, and his mother is Liba Trejbal, a former ballerina from Czechoslovakia. He graduated from Choate Rosemary Hall and Princeton University.

Career
Icahn interned at Goldman Sachs. Shortly after, he directed art films. In 2001, he founded Myelin Media. He joined his father's company, Icahn Enterprises, in 2002. Since June 2004, he has been an investment analyst for Icahn Partners LP, Icahn Master, Icahn Master II and Icahn Master III and Icahn Partners Master Fund LP. He co-manages a hedge fund with David Schechter, which includes the Sargon portfolio from his father's company. Icahn and Schechter have invested heavily in Apple and Netflix shares. In 2011, his hedge fund had a return of 50 percent.

He is Vice President of Modal LLC. He was on the Board of Directors of American Railcar Industries since January 16, 2007, the Hain Celestial Group since July 2010, the Cadus Corporation since July 1, 2010,  Motricity since January, 2010, Bausch Health since March 2021 and Bausch + Lomb Corporation since June 2022. He also serves on the board of Take-Two Interactive and HowStuffWorks.

Icahn played an instrumental role in his father's company's attempted takeover of Lions Gate.

Personal life
Icahn resides on Long Island, New York. In 2012, his father gave him management responsibility for US$3 billion.

References

Living people
1979 births
People from Manhattan
Princeton University alumni
Businesspeople from New York City
American investors
American hedge fund managers
American mass media company founders
American people of Czech descent
American people of Jewish descent
21st-century American businesspeople
Choate Rosemary Hall alumni
People from Long Island